Ramtanu Lahiri  (1813–1898) was a Young Bengal leader, a teacher and a social reformer. Peary Chand Mitra wrote about him, "There are few persons in whom the milk of kindness flows so abundantly. He was never wanting in appreciation of what was right, and in his sympathy with the advanced principles." Sivanath Sastri's Ramtanu Lahiri O Tatkalin Bangasamaj, published in 1903, was not only his biography but also an overview of Bengali society of the era, "a remarkable social document on the period of the Bengal Renaissance."

See also 

 Young Bengal
Ramtanu Lahiri O Tatkalin Bangasamaj

Notes

References
 Ramtanu Lahiri O Tatkalin Banga Samaj in Bengali by Sivanath Sastri
 History of the Bengali-speaking People by Nitish Sengupta
  Sansad Bangali Charitabhidhan (Biographical dictionary) in Bengali edited by Subodh Chandra Sengupta and Anjali Bose

External links
 

1813 births
1898 deaths
19th-century Bengalis
Bengali Hindus
Hare School alumni
Presidency University, Kolkata alumni
People from Krishnagar
Brahmos
Academic staff of Presidency University, Kolkata
Scholars from Kolkata
Academic staff of the University of Calcutta
Young Bengal
Indian social workers
Indian social reformers
Indian scholars
19th-century Indian scholars
Indian educators
19th-century Indian educators
Educators from West Bengal
Social workers from West Bengal
West Bengal academics